The Euroa Football Netball Club, nicknamed the Magpies, is an Australian rules football and netball club sited in the town of Euroa, in the north-east of Victoria.

The club teams has competed in the Goulburn Valley Football League since 1971.

Football Leagues
Euroa Football Club has played in the following football competitions - 
 North Eastern Football Association (NEFA) 
1891–1902, 1909–1912; 
 Waranga North East Football League (WNEFL) 
1913–1930, 1934–1938, 1947–1970; 
 Euroa District Football League (EDFL) 
1903-1908, 1931–1933, 1944–1946 
Goulburn Valley Football League
1971 to present day

Senior Football Premierships (All Leagues)

Euroa District Football League (EDFL) 
1894, 1905 (2 total);

North East Wednesday Football Association 
1911 (1 total)

Waranga North East Football Association/League (WNEFA/L) 
1913, 1922, 1936, 1937, 1957, 1958, 1963, 1964, 1965, 1967, 1969, 1970 (12 total);

Goulburn Valley Football League (GVFL) 
1971, 1990 (2 total)

VFL / AFL Players
The following footballers originally played with Euroa FC prior to making their VFL / AFL debut.
 1901 - Paddy McGuiness - St. Kilda
 1901 - Jim McLean - Melbourne
 1907 - Charles Bolton - Essendon
 1907 - Graham Diggle - Collingwood
 1910 - Bill Scott - Richmond
 1913 - George Pattison - Fitzroy
 1926 - Bert Carey - Fitzroy
 1933 - Jack Sambell - Melbourne
 1936 - Mick McFarlane  - Essendon 
 1951 - Les Reed - Geelong 
 1956 - Dick O'Bree - Collingwood
 1965 - Don Gross - Essendon
 1997 - Hayden Lamaro - Melbourne
 1998 - Rory Hilton - Brisbane Lions
 2000 - Andrew Mills - Richmond
 2010 - Relton Roberts - Richmond
 2012 - Jamie Elliott - Collingwood

The following footballers came to Euroa after playing in the VFA, VFL, AFL, with the year indicating their debut with Euroa FC.
 1948 - Jack Cassin - Essendon
 1951 - Ivor McIvor - Essendon
 1952 - Jack Whelan - Brunswick
 1964 - Bob Hempel - Footscray
 1990 - David Robertson - Collingwood

Notable local Euroa players
 Craig Bamford 375+ Senior games
 Bob Bosustow. Premiership coach 1957 and 58
 Dick O'Bree,  Euroa Premiership player in 1957 and 1958 after kicking 140 goals in a premiership year as a 16 year old at Lake Boga. Began coaching Euroa in 1963 and were premiers in 63,64 and 65. Premiers again in 67,69 and 70. Coached the club to a premiership in 1971 its first year in the GVFL. Kicked over 1200 goals in his career. Also coached the reserves to numerous premierships at the same time as coaching the senior team. Played in 11 premierships. Coached 7 premierships.
 David King - Former NFL Punter with New England Patriots. 
 Kevin Storer. Premiership coach 1990

References

External links

Twitter page

Australian rules football clubs in Victoria (Australia)
Sports clubs established in 1880
1880 establishments in Australia
Australian rules football clubs established in 1880
Goulburn Valley Football League clubs
Euroa
Netball teams in Victoria (Australia)